Rovná may refer to the following places in the Czech Republic:

 Rovná (Pelhřimov District), a village in Pelhřimov District
 Rovná (Sokolov District), a village in Sokolov District
 Rovná (Strakonice District), a village in Strakonice District